The House of Assembly is the legislature of the British Overseas Territory of the Turks and Caicos Islands. The name of the house was changed from the Legislative Council of the Turks and Caicos Islands to its present name following the implementation of the new constitution on 9 August 2006.

In August 2009, the United Kingdom suspended the Turks and Caicos' self-government after allegations of ministerial corruption. The prerogative of the ministerial government and the House of Assembly were vested in the islands' governor until a general election was held in November 2012.

Composition
The House of Assembly has 21 members in total. Formerly, 15 members were elected for a four-year term in single-seat constituencies (of which 11 lay in the Caicos Islands and 4 in the Turks Islands), while 3 members sat ex officio, 3 were appointed members and a speaker was chosen from outside the house.

Although the number of elected representatives to the body was not changed during the 2009-12 suspension of self-government, the composition was changed so that ten of the 15 elected representatives are elected to individual districts, while five are now elected at-large.

Consultative Forum (2009-2012)
Following the suspension of self-government in August 2009, the Governor assembled a Consultative Forum for the Turks and Caicos Islands to advise him on legislation relating to the territory. The forum consisted of the Chief Executive, the Attorney-General, the Permanent Secretary for Finance, and eleven to fifteen representatives of the community, appointed by the Governor. The council could make non-binding recommendations to the Governor about bills that were presented to it and on policies that were referred to it. The chair of the Consultative Forum was Lillian Missick. The forum disbanded in November 2012 upon the election of a new House of Assembly following restoration of self-government to the islands.

Election results
General election results, 2021

See also
List of speakers of the Turks and Caicos Islands House of Assembly

References

 
Legislatures of British Overseas Territories
Politics of the Turks and Caicos Islands
Turks and Caicos Islands